Charmwood is a town in Franklin County, Missouri, United States. The population was estimated at 31 in 2019. The town was incorporated as a result of issues with the Charmwood Subdivision's water and sewer systems. Incorporation allowed the new town to apply for grants from the USDA to upgrade these systems.

Geography
Charmwood is located adjacent to Stanton.

Demographics

2015 American Community Survey
As of the 2015 American Community Survey, the racial makeup of the city was:
100.0% White

References

External links

Villages in Franklin County, Missouri
Populated places established in 2011
Villages in Missouri